Gülhan Şen (born July 16, 1978) is a Turkish television presenter, producer, and speaker.

Biography 
Gülhan Şen was born in Shumen, Bulgaria and completed primary school there. In 1985, her name changed to Galina Hristova Mihaylova due to a compulsory name change law, and a compulsory immigration law applied to Turks brought her to Turkey in 1989.

Şen graduated from Muhsin Adil Binal Secondary School and Kabataş High School in Turkey, and studied radio and television at Istanbul University Communication Faculty. In London, Şen took courses on "Television News and Programs Preparation" at Reuters News Agency.

Career 
Şen worked at HBB, BRT, Star TV and CNN Türk. After directing Türk Sinemasi 2003 ("Turkish Cinema 2003") and  Sis Bulutunun Ardında: Alzheimer ("Fog Clouds: Alzheimer"), she carried on her career by preparing, presenting and directing for the TV 8 Zamanın Ruhu: Zeitgeist ("Spirit of Time: Zeitgeist") programme. On 3 October 2007, her new programme Gülhan'ın Galaksi Rehberi ("Gülhan's Guide to the Galaxy"), a travel show primarily about travel abroad, began on TV 8.

Productions 
Stardust (Star TV, 2002)
Eğitim ve Kariyer ("Education and Career", CNN Türk, 2003)
Zamanın Ruhu: Zeitgeist ("When Spirit: Zeitgeist", TV8, 2004–2007)
Bayanlar Baylar ("Ladies and Gentlemen ", TV8, 2006)
Gülhan'ın Galaksi Rehberi ("Gülhan's Guide to the Galaxy", TV8, later TRT Haber, 2007–)
Pür Dikkat (TV8, 2009)
Kanalizasyon (2009) – Presenter
İşler Güçler (2012) – Deniz

References

1978 births
Living people
Turkish television producers
Turkish television presenters
Kabataş Erkek Lisesi alumni
People from Shumen
Bulgarian Turks in Turkey